Tengku Qayyum Ubaidillah Bin Tengku Ahmad (born 5 March 1986 in Seremban, Negeri Sembilan) is a Malaysian footballer who plays as a left back for KSR SAINS.

Born and raised in Seremban, in the state of Negeri Sembilan, Qayyum began his professional career with Negeri Sembilan youth team. He later was promoted to first team in 2007. Qayyum was a member of the Malaysia U20 at the 2004 AFC Youth Championship.

Club career

Sime Darby
On 18 December 2014, it was announced that Qayyum signed a contract and will represent the club for 2015 season. On 7 February 2015, Qayyum made his league debut for Sime Darby in a 2–0 defeat to Perak at Perak Stadium, Ipoh. Qayyum captained the club to win the 2017 FAM League and was promoted to Malaysia Premier League. However, later the club withdraw from Malaysian football.

Kelantan
On 6 December 2017, Qayyum signed a one-year contract with Kelantan.

Career statistics

Club

Honours

Club
Negeri Sembilan
Malaysia Cup: 2009, 2011
Malaysia FA Cup: 2010
Malaysia Charity Shield: 2012 

Sime Darby
Malaysia FAM League: 2017

References

External links
 

Living people
1986 births
Malaysian footballers
People from Negeri Sembilan
Negeri Sembilan FA players
Kelantan FA players
Sime Darby F.C. players
Malaysia Super League players
Association football fullbacks
Malaysian people of Malay descent